Kunie (written: , ,  or ), sometimes transliterated as Kunié, is a unisex Japanese given name. Notable people with the name include:

, Japanese pioneering woman physician
, Japanese writer
, Japanese footballer
, Japanese volleyball player
, Japanese photographer
, Japanese actor

Japanese unisex given names